Limacology (from Latin , "slug", and Greek , -logia) is the branch of zoology which deals with slugs, i.e. shell-less gastropod mollusks. A person that studies limacology is referred to as a limacologist.

However, slugs are an extremely polyphyletic group, thus "limacology" is not a taxonomically accurate term, and it is now rarely used.

See also

Mollusks
Gastropods

Further reading

Malacology
Gastropods and humans